Ellias is a surname. Notable people with the surname include:

Bina Sarkar Ellias (born 1949), Indian poet and editor
Mohammed Ellias (born 1963), Bangladeshi politician
Roddy Ellias (born 1949), Canadian guitarist, composer, and improviser

See also
Ellia